Bullets Don't Argue (Italian title: Le pistole non discutono, also known as Guns Don't Talk and Pistols Don't Argue) is a 1964 Italian Spaghetti Western directed by Mario Caiano. The film was produced by Jolly Film, back to back with Sergio Leone's A Fistful of Dollars, but with a more extensive budget and anticipating greater success than Leone's film, especially since at the time leading actor Rod Cameron was better known than Clint Eastwood.

Plot
On his wedding day, sheriff Pat Garrett must arrest two bank robbers.

Cast
 Rod Cameron as Pat Garrett
 Horst Frank as  Billy Clayton
 Ángel Aranda as  George Clayton
 Vivi Bach as  Agnes Goddard
 Hans Nielsen as  Reverend Alvarez
  Luis Duran as Mike Goddard
 Kai Fischer as  Helen
 Mimmo Palmara as  Santero
 Andrea Aureli as  Manuel
 José Manuel Martín as Ramon

Release
Bullets Don't Argue was released on 23 October 1964.

References

External links
 

1964 Western (genre) films
1964 films
Cultural depictions of Pat Garrett
Films directed by Mario Caiano
Films scored by Ennio Morricone
Films shot in Almería
Italian Western (genre) films
Spaghetti Western films
West German films
1960s Italian films